The Farnsworth Avenue Bridge is a bridge over the former Camden & Amboy Railroad in Bordentown, New Jersey. It was built in 1831, making it the oldest surviving railway bridge in New Jersey and perhaps the United States.

References

Road bridges in New Jersey
Bridges completed in 1831
Bordentown, New Jersey